Neisseria lactamica is a gram-negative diplococcus bacterium. It is strictly a commensal species of the nasopharynx. Uniquely among the Neisseria they are able to produce β-D-galactosidase and ferment lactose.

This species is most commonly carried by young children.
There is an inverse relationship between colonisation by N. lactamica and Neisseria meningitidis.
Carriage of N. lactamica has been associated with decreased incidence of invasive meningococcal disease. 
However, resistance to penicillin and other beta-lactams may be transmitted from commensal neisseriae such as Neisseria lactamica  to disease causing Neisseria meningitidis by the process of genetic transformation.

References

External links 
 Genome sequence of Neisseria lactamica (an ST640 strain). Published on the Wellcome Trust Sanger Institute ftp server.
 Sequence data from the Neisseria lactamica Y92-1009 genome sequencing project.
 Sequence data from the Neisseria lactamica ATCC 23970 genome sequencing project.
Type strain of Neisseria lactamica at BacDive -  the Bacterial Diversity Metadatabase

Neisseriales